Emil Mikael Ekblom (born 29 January 1994) is a retired Norwegian football striker who last played for KFUM.

Career
Ekblom played youth and junior football for Stabæk before moving to the United States. He studied at the Syracuse University and played for Syracuse Orange, but returned to Norway to pursue a professional career. In 2015, he tried out for, and was signed by, Stabæk. He made his Norwegian Premier League debut in April 2015 against Odd.

Ekblom spent 15 matches on loan at Strømmen IF in 2015, and joined KFUM on loan in 2016. Following that season, the move was made permanent.

Career statistics

References

1994 births
Living people
Sportspeople from Bærum
Norwegian footballers
Stabæk Fotball players
Eliteserien players
Syracuse Orange men's soccer players
Strømmen IF players
KFUM-Kameratene Oslo players
Norwegian First Division players
Norwegian expatriate sportspeople in the United States
Expatriate soccer players in the United States
Norwegian expatriate footballers
Association football forwards